Blair Stewart (born 2 October 1983 in Christchurch) is a New Zealand professional rugby union player. He currently plays at fly-half for Bayonne in the Top 14.

References

External links

Ligue Nationale De Rugby Profile
European Professional Club Rugby Profile
Bayonne Profile

1983 births
Aviron Bayonnais players
New Zealand rugby union players
Living people
Rugby union fly-halves
Rugby union players from Christchurch